Notascea is a genus of moths of the family Notodontidae. It consists of the following species:
Notascea brevispinula Miller, 2008
Notascea nudata (Hering, 1925)
Notascea obliquaria (Warren, 1906)
Notascea straba Miller, 2008

References 

Notodontidae of South America
Notodontidae